Makapanstad is a village and the seat of the (lekapi) Moretele Local Municipality, falling under Bojanala District Municipality in the North West province of South Africa. 

Makapanstad is under the leadership of the Makapan Royal Family.  They are the Bakgatla Ba Mosetlha and their totem animal is the Kgabo (English: their spirit animal is the monkey). The most recent Chief of Makapanstad was Kgosi Motshegwa Hendrick. He died on 26 December 2014.

References

Populated places in the Moretele Local Municipality